This is a list of business schools in South Africa. For the purposes of this list business schools are defined as accredited, degree-granting, postsecondary institutions. Institutions are accredited in South Africa by the Council on Higher Education (CHE), whilst institutions also pursue international accreditation from AMBA, EQUIS and AACSB.

Founded in 1949, the University of Pretoria's now defunct Graduate School of Management was the first business school in South Africa and was the first MBA programme to be launched outside of North America, whilst the University of Cape Town Graduate School of Business and University of Stellenbosch Business School, founded in 1964, are the oldest business schools in continuous operation. Founded in 2005, the Nelson Mandela University Business School is the newest business school in South Africa.

Business schools

1 GIBS offers company specific programmes in London, United Kingdom

2 Note as of January 2008 GIBS replaced the Graduate School of Management

Rankings

League tables of South African business schools are largely based on international business schools rankings, because specifically South African rankings have not as yet been published.

Business school alliances
 South African Business Schools Association (SABSA)

See also
 List of universities in South Africa
 Ranking of South African universities
 List of colleges and universities by country
 List of colleges and universities
 List of post secondary institutions in South Africa
 List of South African university chancellors and vice-chancellors
 List of medical schools in South Africa
 List of law schools in South Africa
 List of architecture schools in South Africa
 Higher Education South Africa
 Academic boycotts of South Africa (historical Apartheid-era)

References

 
Business schools in South Africa
South Africa, Business schools
South Africa